GarageBand is a line of digital audio workstations developed by Apple for macOS, iPadOS, and iOS devices that allows users to create music or podcasts. GarageBand was originally released for macOS in 2004 and brought to iOS in 2011. The app’s music and podcast creation system enables users to create multiple tracks with pre-made MIDI keyboards, pre-made loops, an array of various instrumental effects, and voice recordings.

Apple positions GarageBand for the consumer market, and used to sell the app as part of iLife, a bundle of consumer media apps. For the professional market, Apple offers another digital-audio product, Logic Pro.

History 
GarageBand was developed by Apple under the direction of Dr. Gerhard Lengeling. Dr. Lengeling was formerly from the German company Emagic, makers of Logic Audio. Apple acquired Emagic in July 2002.

Steve Jobs announced the application in his keynote speech at the Macworld Conference & Expo in San Francisco on January 6, 2004. Musician John Mayer assisted with its demonstration. It is part of the iLife '04 package.

Apple announced GarageBand 2 at the 2005 Macworld Conference & Expo on January 11, 2005. It shipped, as announced, around January 22, 2005. Notable new features included the abilities to view and edit music in musical notation. It was also possible to record up to 8 tracks at once and to fix timing and pitch of recordings. Apple added automation of track pan position and the master pitch. Transposition of both audio and MIDI has been added by Apple along with the ability to import MIDI files. It is part of iLife '05.

GarageBand 3, announced at 2006's Macworld Conference & Expo, includes a 'podcast studio', including the ability to use more than 200 effects and jingles, and integration with iChat for remote interviews. It is part of iLife '06.

GarageBand 4, also known as GarageBand '08, is part of iLife '08. It incorporates the ability to record sections of a song separately, such as bridges, and chorus lines. Additionally, it provides support for the automation of tempos and instruments, the creation, and exportation of iPhone ringtones, and a "Magic GarageBand" feature which includes a virtual jam session with a complete 3D view of the Electric instruments.

GarageBand 5 is part of the iLife '09 package. It includes music instruction and allows the user to buy instructional videos by contemporary artists. It also contains new features for electric guitar players, including a dedicated 3D Electric Guitar Track containing a virtual stompbox pedalboard, and virtual amplifiers with spring reverb and tremolo. GarageBand 5 also includes a redesigned user interface as well as Project Templates.

GarageBand 6, also known as GarageBand '11, is part of the iLife '11 package, which Apple released on October 20, 2010. This version brings new features such as Flex Time, a tool to adjust the rhythm of a recording. It also includes the ability to match the tempo of one track with another instantly, additional guitar amps and stompboxes, 22 new lessons for guitar and piano, and "How Did I Play?", a tool to measure the accuracy and progress of a piano or guitar performance in a lesson.

Apple released GarageBand 10 along with OS X 10.9 Mavericks in October 2013. This version has lost Magic GarageBand and the podcast functionality.

Apple updated GarageBand 10 for Mac on March 20, 2014. Version 10.0.2 adds the ability to export tracks in MP3 format as well as a new drummer module, but removed support for podcasting; users with podcast files created in GarageBand 6 can continue to edit them using the older version.

GarageBand was updated to version 10.0.3 on October 16, 2014. This version included myriad bug fixes and several new features including a dedicated Bass Amp Designer, the introduction of global track effects and dynamic track resizing.

Apple released GarageBand 10.2 on June 5, 2017.

Features

Audio recording 
GarageBand is a digital audio workstation (DAW) and music sequencer that can record and play back multiple tracks of audio. Built-in audio filters that use the AU (audio unit) standard allow the user to enhance the audio track with various effects, including reverb, echo, and distortion amongst others. GarageBand also offers the ability to record at both  16-bit and 24-bit Audio Resolution, but at a fixed sample rate of 44.1 kHz. An included tuning system helps with pitch correction and can effectively imitate the Auto-Tune effect when tuned to the maximum level. It also has a large array of preset effects to choose from, with an option to create your own effects.

Virtual software instruments 
GarageBand includes a large selection of realistic, sampled instruments and software modeled synthesizers. These can be used to create original compositions or play music live through the use of a USB MIDI keyboard connected to the computer. An on-screen virtual keyboard is also available as well as using a standard QWERTY keyboard with the "musical typing" feature.  The synthesizers were broken into two groups: [virtual] analog and digital. Each synthesizer has a wide variety of adjustable parameters, including richness, glide, cut off, standard attack, decay, sustain, and release; these allow for a wide array of sound creation. The five synth thumbnails are the ARP 2600, the Minimoog, the Waldorf Wave, the Nord Lead 1 and the Yamaha DX7.

Guitar features 
In addition to the standard tracks, Garageband allows for guitar-specific tracks that can use a variety of simulated amplifiers, stompboxes, and effects processors. These imitate popular hardware from companies including Marshall Amplification, Orange Music Electronic Company, and Fender Musical Instruments Corporation. Up to five simulated effects can be layered on top of the virtual amplifiers, which feature adjustable parameters including tone, reverb, and volume. Guitars can be connected to Macs using the built-in input (requires hardware that can produce a standard stereo signal using a 3.5mm output) or a USB interface.

MIDI editing 
GarageBand can import MIDI files and offers piano roll or notation-style editing and playback. By complying with the MIDI Standard, a user can edit many different aspects of a recorded note, including pitch, velocity, and duration. Pitch was settable to 1/128 of a semitone, on a scale of 0–127 (sometimes described on a scale of 1–128 for clarity). Velocity, which determines amplitude (volume), can be set and adjusted on a scale of 0–127. Note duration can be adjusted manually via the piano roll or in the score view. Note rhythms can be played via the software instruments, or created in the piano roll environment; rhythm correction is also included to lock notes to any time signature subdivision. GarageBand also offers global editing capabilities to MIDI information with Enhanced Timing, also known as Quantizing. While offering comprehensive control over MIDI files, GarageBand does not include several features of professional-level DAWs, such as a sequencer for drum tracks separate from the normal piano roll. However, many of these shortcomings have been addressed with each successive release of GarageBand.

Also of note, MIDI sequences edited or created in GarageBand cannot be exported to other DAWs or programs without first being converted to audio. A MIDI file can be extracted from a loop file created from a region, but this is not a general MIDI export facility, using manual steps and an open-source program.

Music lessons 
A new feature included with GarageBand '09 and later is the ability to download pre-recorded music lessons from GarageBand's Lesson Store for guitar and piano. There are two types of lesson available in the Lesson Store: Basic Lessons, which are a free download, and Artist Lessons, which a user must purchase. The first Basic Lessons for both guitar and piano are included with GarageBand. In GarageBand 10, many sounds (aka patches, which Apple refers to as 'audio units') which are listed within the sound library are dimmed and unusable until the user pays an additional fee which allows the utilization of those sounds, bundled with the guitar and piano lessons. Attempting to click on and select the dimmed audio units to apply to the track causes promotional prompts to appear, requiring the user to log on with their Apple ID and furnish credit card information before knowing the price of the bundle.

In both types of the lesson, a music teacher presents the lesson, which is in a special format offering high-quality video and audio instructions. The lessons include a virtual guitar or piano, which demonstrates finger position and a musical notation area to show the correct musical notations. The music examples used in these lessons features popular music.

In an Artist Lesson the music teacher is the actual musician/songwriter who composed the song being taught in the lesson.  the artists featured are:
Sting (The Police) — "Roxanne", "Message in a Bottle", "Fragile"
Sarah McLachlan — "Angel"
Patrick Stump of Fall Out Boy — "I Don't Care", "Sugar, We're Goin' Down"
Norah Jones — "Thinking About You"
Colbie Caillat — "Bubbly"
Sara Bareilles — "Love Song"
John Fogerty (Creedence Clearwater Revival) — "Proud Mary", "Fortunate Son", "Centerfield"
Ryan Tedder (OneRepublic) — "Apologize"
Ben Folds — "Brick", "Zak and Sara"
John Legend — "Ordinary People"
Alex Lifeson (Rush) — "Tom Sawyer", "Limelight", "Working Man", "The Spirit of Radio".

No new Artist Lessons were released in 2010, and Apple has not announced plans to release additional entries.

In June 2018, the GarageBand 10.3 update made Artist Lessons free.

Additional audio loops 

Garageband includes an extensive array of pre-made audio loops to choose from with an option to import custom sound loops and an additional loop pack that is purchasable via the App Store. All loops have an edit and effects option.

The Additional Audio Loops are as follows

Jam Packs 

Jam Packs are Apple's official add-ons for GarageBand. Each Jam Pack contains loops and software instruments grouped into certain genres and styles.

The Jam Packs are as follows:
 GarageBand Jam Pack: Remix Tools
 GarageBand Jam Pack: Rhythm Section
 GarageBand Jam Pack: Symphony Orchestra
 GarageBand Jam Pack: World Music
 GarageBand Jam Pack: Voices

There was also another GarageBand Jam Pack, initially known just as GarageBand Jam Pack, later GarageBand Jam Pack 1, which Apple discontinued in January 2006. Beginning with the release of the Remix Tools and Rhythm Section Jam Packs, each Jam Pack has been designated with a number. The release of GarageBand Jam Pack: World Music also saw a redesign in packaging.

MainStage 2 
MainStage 2 by Apple also includes 40 built-in instruments – including synths, vintage keyboards, and a drum machine – to use in GarageBand. It also features an interface for live performances and includes a large collection of plug-ins and sounds.

Third-party instrument and Apple Loop packages 
In addition to Apple, many other companies today offer commercial or shareware virtual software instruments designed especially for GarageBand, and collections of Apple Loops intended for GarageBand users.

GarageBand can also use any third-party software synthesizer that adheres to the Core Audio (Audio Units) standard. However, there are limitations, including that Audio Unit instruments which can respond to multiple MIDI channels or ports can be triggered only on the first channel of the first port. This means that multi-timbral instruments which contain multiple channels and respond to many MIDI channels, such as Native Instruments Kontakt and MOTU MachFive, are not ideally suited for use in GarageBand.

Third-party vendors also offer extra loops for use in GarageBand. Users can also record custom loops through a microphone, via a software instrument, or by using an audio interface to connect physically a guitar or other hardware instruments to a Mac or iOS device.

Sample multitrack source files 
In 2005, Trent Reznor from the band Nine Inch Nails released the source multitrack GarageBand files for the song "The Hand That Feeds" to allow the public to experiment with his music, and permitted prospective GarageBand users to remix the song. He also gave permission for anyone to share their personalized remix with the world. Since then, Nine Inch Nails has released several more GarageBand source files, and several other artists have also released their GarageBand files that the public could use to experiment.

New Zealand band Evermore also released the source multi-track files for GarageBand for their song "Never Let You Go".

Ben Folds released Stems & Seeds, a special version of his 2008 album Way to Normal. Stems and Seeds contained a remastered version of Way to Normal, and a separate disc containing GarageBand files for each track from the album to allow fans to remix the songs.

Limitations 
A lack of MIDI-out capability limits the use of external MIDI instruments. There is also only limited support for messages sent from knobs on MIDI keyboards, as only real-time pitch bend, modulation, sustain, and foot control is recognizable. However, since GarageBand '08, other parameters affected by MIDI knobs can be automated later, per-track. GarageBand has no functions for changing time signature mid-song though the software does now allow a tempo track to automate tempo changes.

Other than pitch bend, GarageBand is limited to the pitches and intervals of standard 12-tone equal temperament, so it does not natively support xenharmonic music. Logic Pro supports many different tunings. GarageBand does not support different tunings however, audio units which support micro tuning (using .scl or .tun files, or some other method) can be employed in GarageBand to produce alternative pitches.

Before GarageBand 10, there was no export option, and the only option was to save files as .band or export to iTunes. There is no built-in MIDI export feature, although regions can be manually exported as loops and converted to MIDI files.

GarageBand for iOS 

On March 2, 2011, Apple announced a version of GarageBand for the iPad. It has many features similar to the macOS version. Music can be created using the on-screen instruments, which include keyboards, drums, a sampler, and various "smart instruments". It also acts as a multitrack recording studio with Stompbox effects and guitar amps. Songs can be emailed or sent to an iTunes Library. Additionally, projects can be imported to GarageBand for macOS, where they are further editable. This feature also allows instruments from the iOS platform to be savable to software instrument library on the Mac. However projects created in the macOS version cannot be opened in the iOS version. The app is compatible with iPhone 3GS or higher, the third generation iPod Touch or higher, and all versions of the iPad, including the iPad Mini. The app, with all instruments included, was available for $6.99 from the Apple App Store. In 2017, it was made free.

Instruments 
GarageBand comes with a wide range of different instruments for the user to use. All non-drum instruments (with the exception of the koto) come with the functionality to limit the note selection to different musical scales.

Keyboard 
The keyboard is set up like a standard keyboard, and features several keyboard instruments, including grand piano, electric piano, various organs, clavinet, synth leads, synth pads, and bass synths. It also has many different non-keyboard instrument sounds including versions of many of the other instruments, for example users can use the keyboard to play guitar, bass and string sounds. In version 2.2, the Alchemy Synth synth engine from Logic Pro was also added to the keyboard. The keyboard has several additional features including a pitch bend, arpeggiator and "autoplay" function (which will play one of 4 rhythms for each instrument). Many of the instruments have adjustable parameters such as Attack, Cutoff and Resonance. Prior to version 2.2 there was also a separate "Smart Keyboard" instrument which was arranged like the other smart instruments, allowing the user to play chords on a limited selection of keyboard instruments (piano, electric piano, organ, clavinet, and four adjustable synthesizers). This functionality has since been integrated into the main keyboard instrument in version 2.2 with the new "Chord Strips" that allow the user to access the layout from the Smart Keyboard using any keyboard instrument.

Drums 
There are three different kinds of drum instruments in GarageBand. The touch drums instrument includes by default 7 acoustic drum kits with a realistic drum kit layout, and 12 electronic drum kits (including Hip Hop drums, House drums, and drum kits with Roland TR-808 and 909 samples). The electronic kits are set up like drum machines with customizable sounds that can be saved as separate drum kits. The Chinese Kit was later added in version which included genuine Chinese sounds like the gong. The "Smart Drums" instrument allows the arranging of drum sounds on a grid by complexity and volume. It contains a selection six drums (Classic Studio Kit, Live Rock Kit, Vintage Kit, Classic Drum Machine, Hip Hop Drum Machine, and House Drum Machine). The "Beat Sequencer" involves the placement of steps to form a beat pattern. There are many pre-sets patterns to choose from and users can customise aspects of the pattern such as note velocity and probability.

Smart Guitar 
GarageBand includes 5 guitars: an acoustic guitar, three electric guitars, and a distortion guitar. Each guitar (except for the acoustic one) has two optional sound boxes. The instrument is set up with two different modes. The first is set up like the Chord Strips, where multiple chords are playable. Each note in a chord can also be played separately, or muted by holding the left side of the string. This mode includes an autoplay feature which will play one of 4 different rhythms depending on which guitar is chosen.

Smart Bass 
The bass instrument is set up like the guitar, where four strings can play various notes. However, the bass cannot play chords. Included are three electric basses, an acoustic orchestral bass, and four customizable synth basses. Like the smart keyboard and smart guitars, there is an "autoplay" feature.

Smart Strings 
Smart Strings were added in version 1.2 and consist of a string section made of 1st and 2nd violins, violas, cellos, and bass. They capable of playing notes legato, staccato, and pizzicato depending on if the user swipes up and down, flicks or taps their screen respectively. The orchestra is customizable, including four different string styles (all with a different "autoplay" feature) and the option to choose which instruments playing. For example, one can play a chord made up of all the available instruments, or simply play a violin note.

World 
World instruments were added in version 2.3 which allow the user to play traditional Chinese and Japanese instruments. The instruments available are the pipa, erhu, koto and guzheng.

Drummer 
The Drummer was added in version 2.1 and is a virtual player who will create realistic drum grooves. There are numerous drummers to choose from in various genres. Each drummer has a unique kit, which can be an acoustic, electronic or percussion drum kit. Users can also customise the playing style of each drummer, including choosing from various preset rhythms. They can also adjust which parts of the drum kit the drummer will play, the amount of swing and if the drummer should follow the rhythm of another track.

Sampler 
In the sampler, the user can import or record their own sound and then play it on the keyboard (it has the same interface as the keyboard instrument). After the sound has been recorded or imported, it can be modified with a various amount of tools within the sampler in order to trim or reverse the sample, loop a section of it or adjust the tuning and volume envelope of the sample. The app comes with numerous sound effects such as a dog bark, party horn and cheering already available to use in the sampler.

Audio recorder 
The audio recorded is a standard recorder for recording and editing audio. Audio can be recorded through the device's internal microphone, a headphone microphone or external microphone connected to the device via an audio interface. After the sound has been recorded, many audio effects can be applied. The recorder comes with various presets designed for recording different sounds like Guitar, Piano or Lead vocals, all with adjustable parameters.

Amp 
The amp is designed to be played by plugging a guitar or bass into the device and recording, but can also work with sounds from the audio recorder, included Apple Loops, and imported music files. Within it are several customizable amplifiers and stompboxes, allowing for a broad range of different sounds.

External apps 
Third-party music apps can be used inside GarageBand one of two ways. The Audio Unit Extensions feature allows third-party instruments and effect plug-ins to be played and used directly inside of GarageBand as if they were native to the app. The Inter-App Audio functionality lets you record audio from another app into GarageBand.

Sound Library 
The Sound Library was added in November 2017 with the 2.3.1 update and lets the user download additional free instruments, drummers and loops released as Sound Packs that are added to the app over time.

Updates 

On November 1, 2011, Apple introduced GarageBand for iOS 1.1, adding support for the iPhone and iPod Touch, among other features. These included the ability to create custom 3/4 and 6/8 time signatures, and exporting in AAC or AIFF format.

On March 7, 2012, Apple updated GarageBand to 1.2, adding support for the third-generation iPad. It introduced the new Smart Strings instrument, a string orchestra of 1st and 2nd violins, violas, celli, and bass, capable of playing notes legato, staccato, and pizzicato. Additionally, it added synthesizers to the Smart Keyboard and Smart Bass instruments. It also added a note editor which allows users to fine-tune note placement and length and the ability to upload songs to Facebook, YouTube and SoundCloud, as well as the ability to upload projects to iCloud. It also included Jam Session, a feature that enables up to 4 iPhones, iPod Touches, and/or iPads with GarageBand installed to play simultaneously.

On May 1, 2012, GarageBand was updated to 1.2.1, providing minor bug fixes and stability improvements.

Alongside the new iOS 6, Apple updated GarageBand to 1.3 on September 19, 2012. The update added the ability to import music from one's music library, ringtone creation, the ability to use the app in the background, and minor bug fixes.

GarageBand was updated to 1.4 on March 20, 2013. The update added support for Audiobus, the ability to remove grid snapping, and minor bug fixes.

GarageBand received an overhaul of design coinciding with the reveal of the iPad Air on October 22, 2013. GarageBand 2.0 features a new design to match iOS 7, an extended number of tracks per song, and new functions in the Sampler instrument.

In January 2016, version 2.1 was released in which GarageBand received a new Live Loops layout that lets users create and perform music by triggering loops and adding effects in real-time. Other features in the update included the ability to add a virtual Drummer, increased maximum number of tracks up to 32, the ability to edit volume automation curves and the addition of basic EQ and compressor plug-ins. Amplifiers for bass guitars were also added. Third-party instrument apps could now be used inside GarageBand via Audio Unit Extensions.

In January 2017, version 2.2 was released with a number of new features including the Alchemy Synth previously only available in Logic Pro. Audio Unit Extension compatibility was updated to also allow third-party effects apps to be used.

A new Sound Library was added in November 2017 which allows users to download additional free instruments and loops released as part of Sound Packs that are added to the app over time. A new Beat Sequencer for creating drum beats was also added in this update.

MIDI support was added in update 2.3.6 in September 2018.

In July 2021, GarageBand released multiple new Sound Packs with loops and instruments from many producers such as Boys Noize, as well as two Remix Sessions from Dua Lipa and Lady Gaga that allow users to remix their songs.

In August 2022, GarageBand released 2 Remix Sessions from Seventeen and Katy Perry.

In December 2022, GarageBand released a Remix Session from Zedd.

Differences from MacOS version 

No Music Lessons.
Only three time signatures (4/4, 3/4, and 6/8).
No master track.
Automation is only available for volume.
Live Loops layout.
Audio Unit Extensions (via App Store).
A Sound Library providing free, downloadable content such as additional keyboards, drum sets, and more.
Limited exporting functions (As of 2.3.3, the option to export recorded project as songs to YouTube has been removed).

Availability 
Prior to the launch of Apple's Mac App Store, GarageBand was only available as a part of iLife, a suite of applications (also including iPhoto, iMovie, iDVD, and iWeb) intended to simplify the creation and organization of digital content, or available on a new Mac. On January 6, 2011, GarageBand was made available independently on the Mac App Store in addition to iPhoto and iMovie. Since then Garageband's user base has increased drastically.

Notable GarageBand Users 
GarageBand has been embraced by many musicians of varying levels of fame in order to record and produce music. Steve Lacy used the GarageBand app on his cracked 2012 iPhone to produce music for his solo projects, the Internet, and J. Cole. That phone is currently on display in the Smithsonian. Nine Inch Nails made their song "The Hand That Feeds" in the software, and released a link to the multitrack GarageBand file on the band's website, allowing other GarageBand users to remix the song. Musicians that have collaborated with Apple to promote GarageBand include Katy Perry, John Mayer, Dua Lipa, Billie Eilish, and Lady Gaga. Charlotte Day Wilson, Doja Cat, Ellie Rowsell (of Wolf Alice), Sloan Struble (of Dayglow), Meghan Trainor, Ethel Cain, and Awkwafina all began learning to produce and create music using GarageBand. GarageBand was also used by artists such as T-Pain; Grimes for her album Visions; Anne Clark of St. Vincent for multiple projects; Danielle Haim for Haim songs, with the song "Summer Girl" starting out as a GarageBand demo; and Jesse Rutherford for his sophomore solo album, GARAGEB&, named after the application, as he produced most of the tracks in GarageBand. In addition, Rihanna's hit "Umbrella" was born from a stock GarageBand drum track. As well, the music for the viral internet video Charlie the Unicorn was recorded in GarageBand.

Supported music file formats 
This app supports many music formats, including AIFF, WAV, and MIDI. The app can export songs to AAC, MP3, MP4 or AIFF format.

Support for 8-bit audio files was dropped in version 10.

See also 
List of MIDI editors and sequencers
List of music software

References

External links 

 
 Garageband Alternatives

MacOS audio editors
Apple Inc. software
IOS-based software made by Apple Inc.
IOS software
Music software
Audio recording software